Tomato is a brand in Croatian mobile communications market owned by A1. It has its own numeration (starting with +385 92) and it is primarily a prepaid product. It functions as a mobile virtual network operator.

Tomato offers 2G (GSM), 3G (HSPA+), 4G (LTE) and 5G voice, text and data services. It was launched in June 2006 and advertised as a cheap network, coinciding with the deployment of the Tele2 network which had the same marketing strategy.

External links
 http://www.tomato.com.hr/
 Press releases 

Mobile virtual network operators
Telecommunications companies of Croatia
Mobile phone companies of Croatia
Telecommunications companies established in 2006
Croatian companies established in 2006